The 1968 Montana gubernatorial election took place on November 5, 1968. Incumbent Governor of Montana Tim Babcock, who became Governor upon the death of previous Governor Donald Grant Nutter and was re-elected in 1964, ran for re-election. He faced serious competition in the Republican primary from his Lieutenant Governor, but managed to comfortably win renomination. Advancing to the general election, Babcock faced Forrest H. Anderson, the Attorney General of Montana and the Democratic nominee, and independent candidate Wayne Montgomery of the New Reform Party. Ultimately, Anderson managed to defeat Babcock by a solid margin, winning his first and only term as governor.

Democratic primary

Candidates
Forrest H. Anderson, Attorney General of Montana
Eugene H. Mahoney, State Senator
LeRoy H. Anderson, State Senator, former United States Congressman from Montana's 2nd congressional district
Willard E. Fraser, Mayor of Billings
Hanford K. Gallup, rancher
Merrill K. Riddick

Results

Republican primary

Candidates
Tim Babcock, incumbent Governor of Montana
Ted James, Lieutenant Governor of Montana
Warren A. McMillan
J. Wellington Fauver

Results

General election

Results

References

Montana
Gubernatorial
1968
November 1968 events in the United States